Devious Maids is an American mystery comedy-drama television series, which premiered on Lifetime on June 23, 2013. The series was created by Marc Cherry, and is loosely based on Mexican TV series Ellas son la Alegría del Hogar. Ana Ortiz, Dania Ramirez, Roselyn Sánchez, Judy Reyes, and Edy Ganem star as five Latina maids working in the homes of Beverly Hills’ wealthiest and most powerful families.

ABC ordered the pilot on January 31, 2012. On May 14, 2012, the pilot was not picked up by ABC for the 2012–13 United States network schedule. However, on June 22, 2012, Lifetime picked up the pilot with a thirteen-episode order. Lifetime renewed the show for a 10-episode fourth season on September 24, 2015. 

 On September 1, 2016, Lifetime canceled Devious Maids after four seasons.

Series overview

Episodes

Season 1 (2013)

Season 2 (2014)

Season 3 (2015)

Season 4 (2016)

Ratings

References

External links
 
 

Devious Maids
Lists of American comedy-drama television series episodes